Elif Altınkaynak Çahlıyan (born 20 August 1974) is a Turkish archer. She competed at the 1996 Summer Olympics in Atlanta, where she placed 4th in the women's individual contest, and fourth in the team contest with the Turkish team. At the 2000 Summer Olympics in Sydney she again placed 4th with the Turkish team.

References

1974 births
Living people
People from Isparta
Turkish female archers
Archers at the 1996 Summer Olympics
Archers at the 2000 Summer Olympics
Olympic archers of Turkey